Lock Every Door is a 2019 thriller novel by American author Todd Ritter, writing under the pen name of Riley Sager. The novel made the New York Times Bestseller List for July 21, 2019.

The novel is set primarily during Jules's time in the apartment building and is interspersed with portions set during current day, when Jules has attempted to flee the building for reasons that become apparent as the plot progresses.

Synopsis
This synopsis is in chronological order as opposed to book order.

Jules Larsen is at the end of her rope. She lost both her job and her boyfriend, Andrew, and is now living with her best friend, Chloe, in New York City. With no job prospects, Jules answers a job posting for an apartment sitter for an upscale apartment in The Bartholomew after the death of its occupant. Leslie Evelyn is the woman in charge of hiring new tenants. She explains that they cannot let an apartment sit empty for more than a month's time, so as to deter burglars, and that Jules will live in the apartment until the family determines what they want to do with the unit. 

Jules has always dreamed of living in The Bartholomew since her favorite book is "The Heart of a Dreamer" written by Greta Manville. Jules's sister, Jane, also loved the book, but went missing years ago. Jules's parents committed suicide by setting their home on fire shortly after Jane's disappearance. For Jules, this job is an opportunity to start over and live out a childhood fantasy. 

While staying in the building, however, Jules learns that other people, predominantly apartment sitters, have gone missing in The Bartholomew. She soon discovers that a woman named Erica Mitchell, who had previously stayed in apartment 12A before her, was very likely abducted for unknown reasons. Jules finds evidence to support this and grows even more suspicious after a sitter for another apartment, Ingrid, goes missing. This leads her to believe that the building owners are part of a satanic group called the Golden Chalice and that the missing people were used as sacrifices to lengthen their lifespans. Terrified, Jules flees The Bartholomew, upon which point she is hit by a car and hospitalized. She initially tries to explain what has happened to the hospital staff, only to discover that she is once again in the clutches of the group.

One of the members, Nick, explains that the group is not satanic. He further states that while the apartment building was initially built in order to protect its inhabitants from outside diseases and contaminants, it now serves as a black market for the wealthy to obtain organs from unwitting donors, typically sitters or other people with no place to go and no one to turn to. Jules manages to escape from the clinic, which is located in The Bartholomew, and the building as a whole. In the process she stabs Nick and sets fire to his apartment, as he had tried to stop her from leaving. After the fire has been extinguished the police investigate the building and uncover the scheme. As a result many celebrities and former residents of the building are either arrested or commit suicide and the building itself is demolished.

Release
Lock Every Door was first published in the United States in hardback and ebook format on July 2, 2019 through Dutton Publishing. An audiobook adaptation narrated by Dylan Moore was released on the same day through Penguin Audio. Dutton also released a paperback edition of Lock Every Door on May 5, 2020.

Television series 
In July 2019 Paramount Television, Sugar 23, and Anonymous Content announced plans to adapt Lock Every Door into a television series. Brian Buckner will serve as an executive producer and writer for the series while Angela Robinson has been announced as director.

Reception 
Lock Every Door received reviews from outlets such as the Wall Street Journal and NY Journal of Books, the former of which stated that Sager "relates ominous events and spooky developments with skill, adding an element of social commentary and a surprise twist ending—elevating this exercise in terror above the ordinary shocker." Oline Cogdill, writing for the Associated Press, drew favorable comparisons between the novel and Ira Levin's Rosemary's Baby, noting that Sager dedicated the book to Levin. The Virginian-Pilot also wrote a favorable review.

References

External links

 

New York City in fiction
2019 American novels
American thriller novels
Organ trade in fiction
Novels by Riley Sager
E. P. Dutton books